Karen Waldbillig Kasich (born December 26, 1963) is an American business executive and wife of Governor of Ohio and former 2016 presidential candidate John Kasich.

Kasich was born in Upper Arlington, Ohio, a suburb of Columbus, and obtained a bachelor's degree in communications from Ohio State University. She and then-Congressman Kasich were married in 1997.

Kasich left her job as vice president with GSW Worldwide, a health-care advertising agency, to become a full-time parent when the Kasichs' twin daughters, Emma and Reese, were 2 years old.

Karen Kasich, alongside Emma and Reese, campaigned with the Governor in New Hampshire in the weeks before the New Hampshire Republican primary, 2016.

Political efforts

As a result of the loss of her mother to congestive heart failure, Kasich has been involved in multiple statewide efforts to increase awareness surrounding women's heart health. She has partnered with the Ohio State University’s College of Nursing and the Million Hearts Campaign, which promotes health screenings that aid in the prevention of heart attacks and strokes. She also serves as statewide ambassador for After-School All-Stars Ohio, "a program that provides at-risk students with after-school academic support, mentoring, and fitness activities in a safe environment."

Kasich is currently a member of both The Partnership at Drugfree.org’s public relations advisory board and the Ohio Valley’s Go Red for Women Council (a program of the American Heart Association which empowers women to live heart-healthy lifestyles). Additionally, she is an Ohio Department of Transportation’s Safe Routes to School ambassador, and her efforts involve encouraging children to walk and bike to school safely and confidently.

Along with her husband, John Kasich, she has toured Ohio to promote Ohio’s youth drug prevention program, Start Talking!.

Personal life
A self-professed "fitness freak," Kasich enjoys swimming and running, and has completed multiple marathons.

Media
Karen Kasich: Fitness Fanatic and First Lady of Ohio

References

1963 births
First Ladies and Gentlemen of Ohio
John Kasich
Living people
Ohio Republicans
Ohio State University School of Communication alumni